The Wall of Tears (Spanish: El Muro de las Lágrimas) is a historical site 5 km west of Puerto Villamil on Isabela Island in the Galapagos Islands, Ecuador. It was constructed between the years of 1945 and 1959 by prisoners in the penal colony on the island, which had been established by President José María Velasco Ibarra in 1944, using infrastructure left by the US military after World War II.

The wall is about 25 m (65 ft) tall and is said to have been the cause of thousands of deaths during its construction. Locals call it the wall of tears because it is said to emanate eerie cries and have a heavy energy surrounding it.

References

External links
 Muro de las Lágrimas, Google Street view panorama

Buildings and structures in Galápagos Province
Buildings and structures completed in 1959